Myxasteridae is a family of deep-sea velatid sea stars containing nine species in three genera.

Taxonomy
List of families according to World Register of Marine Species:
 genus Asthenactis Fisher, 1906
 Asthenactis australis McKnight, 2006
 Asthenactis fisheri Alton, 1966
 Asthenactis papyraceus Fisher, 1906
 genus Heligmaster Mah, 2022
 Heligmaster kanaloa Mah, 2022
 Heligmaster pele Mah, 2022
 genus Myxaster Perrier, 1885
 Myxaster medusa (Fisher, 1913)
 Myxaster perrieri Koehler, 1896
 Myxaster sol Perrier, 1885
 genus Pythonaster Sladen in Thomson & Murray, 1885
 Pythonaster atlantidis A.H. Clark, 1948
 Pythonaster murrayi Sladen, 1889
 Pythonaster pacificus Downey, 1979

References

Velatida
Echinoderm families